Fredrik Ulf Yngve Jacobson (born 26 September 1974) is a Swedish professional golfer who plays on the PGA Tour and formerly the European Tour.

Early life
Jacobson was born in Kungsbacka, 30 kilometers south of Gothenburg, at the west coast of Sweden. At young age, he was a promising ice hockey player. When Jacobson was 10 years old, he started playing golf. The club pro, Per Nellbeck, at the local golf club, Kungsbacka Golf Club, also played ice hockey and taught the entire Jacobson family to play, his parents Ulf and Monica and his sister Therese, who also came to be a golf professional.

Jacobson also showed early talent in table tennis and ranked top 30 in his country at age 14-15.

Amateur career
At age 18, Jacobson won both the European and the World final of the 1992 Doug Sanders International Junior Championship at Hazlehead Golf Club, Aberdeen, Scotland.

In 1994, Jacobson won the last edition of the British Youths Open Championship, scoring 277 at Royal St Davis.

Jacobson represented Sweden at the 1994 Eisenhower Trophy at Le Golf National outside Paris, France. He finished 3rd with his team and best Swedish player, tied 4th individually, one stroke ahead of Tiger Woods.

Professional career
He turned professional in late in 1994 and qualified for the 1995 European Tour through qualifying school, He was a member of the European Tour in 1995 and from 1997 to 2004. In December 2002 he won his first European Tour title, belonging to the 2002-2003 season, and went on to claim two more victories that season. His fourth-place finish on the Order of Merit that year equalled Anders Forsbrand's Swedish record set in 1992, and was the first Swede to win three official money events in one season on the European Tour. Jacobson's victory at the 2003 Algarve Open de Portugal was the 50th win by a Swedish player on the European Tour.

At the 2003 German Masters, Jacobson tied the European Tour 18-hole scoring record for one round, by shooting 12 under par 60 in the first round. The record was beaten in 2018, when Oliver Fisher scored a round of 59 at the Portugal Masters, but it is still, as of November 2020, a tied European Tour record in relation to par. It was also the lowest 18 hole score ever by a Swedish male player.

Jacobson was the top scorer in the 2003 Seve Trophy, representing the Continent of Europe against Great Britain and Ireland. He collected four and a half points out of five.

In 2004 he just missed out on a Ryder Cup place, finishing one place short in both the European Tour rankings and the world ranking points rankings, and not being selected as a captain's pick.

In 2004, he joined the PGA Tour. Jacobson won his first PGA Tour title in 2011 at the Travelers Championship. He beat Ryan Moore, who missed a short four footer at the 72nd hole which would have gotten him into a playoff with Jacobson, but instead settled for a tie with John Rollins one shot behind. During the week, Jacobson went 63 holes bogey-free until the difficult par four 10th on Sunday where he made a bogey five. He hit 100% of the fairways during rounds three and four.

In November 2011, Jacobson had his best finish ever in a World Golf Championship event when he finished solo 2nd at the WGC-HSBC Champions in Shanghai, China. Jacobson had led the tournament after rounds two and three and entered the final round with a two stroke advantage over Louis Oosthuizen. However it was a final round surge from Martin Kaymer that denied Jacobson, the German firing nine birdies on the day to post a 63. Jacobson could only record a 71 to fall short by three strokes.

At the 2013 Northern Trust Open, Jacobson had a chance to win his second PGA Tour title when he birdied the 15th and 16th holes in the final round to tie the lead. He then missed a short birdie putt at the 17th to take the outright lead. On the 72nd hole, Jacobson missed a five-foot par putt, which left him one shot outside of the playoff.

Jacobson has been featured in the top 20 of the Official World Golf Rankings, with 16th his highest position, received in November 2003.

Jacobson cut his 2014-15 season short after the Crowne Plaza Invitational to care for his son Max, who underwent open-heart surgery. The procedure was successful, and Max recovered well. The PGA Tour granted Jacobson a medical extension under the family crisis provision. Jacobson fulfilled his medical extension with a fifth-place finish at the 2016 RSM Classic.

Amateur wins
1992 Doug Sanders International Junior Golf Championship, Euro Junior Masters, Swedish Junior under 18 Championship, Greek Junior Open Championship
1994 British Youths Open Amateur Championship

Professional wins (4)

PGA Tour wins (1)

European Tour wins (3)

1Co-sanctioned by the Asian Tour

European Tour playoff record (1–2)

Results in major championships

CUT = missed the half-way cut
"T" = tied

Summary

Most consecutive cuts made – 5 (2012 Masters – 2013 Masters)
Longest streak of top-10s – 2 (2003 U.S. Open – 2003 Open Championship)

Results in The Players Championship

CUT = missed the halfway cut
"T" indicates a tie for a place

Results in World Golf Championships

QF, R16, R32, R64 = Round in which player lost in match play
"T" = tied
Note that the HSBC Champions did not become a WGC event until 2009.

Team appearances
Amateur
Jacques Léglise Trophy (representing the Continent of Europe): 1992
European Boys' Team Championship (representing Sweden): 1992
European Amateur Team Championship (representing Sweden): 1993
Eisenhower Trophy (representing Sweden): 1994

Professional
WGC-World Cup (representing Sweden): 2003, 2004
Seve Trophy (representing Continental Europe): 2003

References

External links

Swedish male golfers
European Tour golfers
PGA Tour golfers
Swedish expatriate sportspeople in the United States
Sportspeople from Halland County
People from Kungsbacka
People from Hobe Sound, Florida
1974 births
Living people